The Boston University Terriers are the ten men's and fourteen women's varsity athletic teams representing Boston University in NCAA Division I competition. Boston University's team nickname is the Terriers, and the official mascot is Rhett the Boston Terrier. The school colors are Scarlet and White. The mascot is named Rhett after Rhett Butler from Gone With the Wind, because "no one loves Scarlet more than Rhett."

The majority of BU's teams compete as members of the Patriot League, with the ice hockey teams competing in Hockey East and rowing competing in the EARC.

Conference change 
On July 1, 2013, Boston University left the America East Conference and joined the Patriot League.

Sports sponsored 

Boston University is one of 4 NCAA Division I schools to not sponsor at least one of women's volleyball or baseball (The other 3 being Detroit Mercy, Drexel, and Vermont).

Ice hockey 

Boston University's ice hockey team is the most successful sports program at the school, with five national championships (1971, 1972, 1978, 1995, 2009) and 21 appearances in the Frozen Four. The Terriers have also been the national runners-up five times, and have won five ECAC tournament championships and seven Hockey East tournament championships. Many of BU's hockey players have gone on to successful careers in the NHL.

Since 1984 the Terriers have played in the Hockey East conference, along with crosstown arch-rivals Boston College (BC).  The series with Boston College is known as the Green Line Rivalry or the Battle of Commonwealth Avenue.  Under long-time coach and former player, Jack Parker, BU excelled in the 1990s, winning six Hockey East regular season titles, four Hockey East tournament titles, the 1995 National Championship and three National runner-up trophies. BU missed the Frozen Four for 11 consecutive seasons beginning in 1998 but returned to glory by winning the national championship in 2009.

BU has dominated the annual Beanpot tournament, which has been contested by the four Boston metro area-based collegiate teams – the others being BC, Northeastern and Harvard – since the 1952–53 season. The televised tourney is a local institution, played in front of annual sellouts at the TD Garden, and is a fierce battle for bragging rights.  As of 2010, the Terriers have won 29 of 58 Beanpots and 12 of the last 16.

Other varsity sports 

For most other sports, BU competes in the Patriot League. The men's basketball team earned post-season berths in the NCAA tournament or NIT four straight seasons between 2002 and 2005 and also in 2011. They are known to have a rivalry with the Albany Great Danes and the Vermont Catamounts. The program is notable for grooming big name college coaches such as Rick Pitino, Mike Jarvis, and Patrick Chambers.

The Terriers also have a history of national success in men's and women's soccer, field hockey, and women's lacrosse. The men's and women's rowing teams compete in the EARC and EAWRC respectively, the oldest and most competitive conference in collegiate rowing.  In 1991 and 1992 the women's rowing team won back-to-back national championships.

Championships

National team championships 

Men's (5)
Ice Hockey (5): 1971, 1972, 1978, 1995, 2009
Women's (2)
Rowing- Varsity Eight (2): 1991, 1992

Conference championships 

Men's conference championships
Hockey (16): 1965, 1967, 1971, 1976, 1978, 1979, 1994, 1995, 1996, 1997, 1998, 2000, 2006, 2009, 2015, 2017 - Tournament (14): 1972, 1974, 1975, 1976, 1977, 1986, 1991, 1994, 1995, 1997, 2006, 2009, 2015, 2018
Basketball (8): 1980, 1983, 1990, 1997, 1998, 2003, 2004, 2014 - Tournament (7): 1983, 1988, 1990, 1997, 2002, 2011, 2020
Football (5): 1980, 1982, 1983, 1984, 1993
Lacrosse (1): 2022 - Tournament (1): 2022
Soccer (12): 1988, 1990, 1991, 1992, 1993, 1994, 2001, 2004, 2008, 2010, 2011, 2014 - Tournament (7): 1993, 1994, 1995, 1996, 1997, 2004, 2008
Tennis (4): 1988, 1993, 1994, 1996
Swimming & Diving (2): 1993, 2013
Cross Country (11): 1989, 1990, 1991, 1992, 1993, 1994, 1995, 1996, 1997, 2000, 2010

Women's conference championships
Hockey (2): 2011, 2013 - Tournament (5): 2010, 2012, 2013, 2014, 2015
Basketball (3): 1988, 2009, 2012 - Tournament (3): 1988, 1989, 2003
Soccer (12): 2000, 2001, 2003, 2005, 2007, 2008, 2009, 2010, 2011, 2012 - Tournament (9): 2000, 2001, 2003, 2005, 2007, 2008, 2009, 2010, 2011
Lacrosse (6): 2000, 2003, 2005, 2008, 2009, 2012 - Tournament (9): 2000, 2002, 2003, 2005, 2006, 2007, 2008, 2009, 2010
Field Hockey (12): 2000, 2002, 2003, 2005, 2006, 2007, 2008, 2009, 2010 - Tournament (8): 1991, 1993, 1999, 2000, 2005, 2006, 2007, 2009
Softball (8): 1993, 2001, 2002, 2003, 2007, 2010, 2011, 2012 - Tournament (9): 1992, 1993, 1996, 1997, 2002, 2003, 2009, 2010, 2012, 2014
Swimming & Diving (5): 1990, 1994, 2009, 2010, 2012
Indoor Track & Field (13): 1990, 1991, 1992, 1997, 1999, 2000, 2002, 2006, 2007, 2008, 2009, 2012, 2014
Outdoor Track & Field (3): 1993, 2008, 2014
Cross Country (13): 1990, 1992, 1993, 1994, 1996, 1997, 1998, 1999, 2000, 2001, 2002, 2004, 2005, 2006, 2013, 2014
Golf (13): 1990, 1992, 1993, 1994, 1996, 1997, 1998, 1999, 2000, 2001, 2002, 2004, 2005, 2006, 2013, 2014

New facilities 
In 2005, Boston University opened Agganis Arena for Hockey and Basketball.  The facility was designed as a hockey arena: a departure from BU's Walter Brown Arena which had the smallest playing ice in Division I.  Agganis Arena seats six to seven thousand, and also serves the city of Boston as a mid-size venue for popular events that could not fill the 18,624 seat TD Garden (previously the Fleet Center).  The arena is named after Harry Agganis, "The Golden Greek," BU alumnus, Terrier sports star, Boston Red Sox first baseman, and Boston native who died of a pulmonary embolism in 1955 at the age of 26.

Other facilities include the indoor Track and Tennis Center and the Fitness and Recreation Center, which includes a pool and diving well for the swim teams. The 200 meter indoor track is modelled on the previous high-banked Armory track, which attracted programs looking to run fast times. The turns, banked up to 18.5 degrees help runners push through turns at normal speed and rhythm, and can produce many personal indoor bests. The Track and Tennis Center hosts the annual BU Invitational. At the 2018 BU Valentine Invitational, Edward Cheserek ran a 3:49.44 mile to become the second-fastest indoor miler of all-time.

Soccer and lacrosse are played on the artificial surface of Nickerson Field.

Field hockey competes at New Balance Field.

Mascot 
Rhett the Boston Terrier is the official costumed mascot of the Boston University (BU) and the Boston University Academy (BUA) Terriers. The Boston Terrier has been the BU mascot since 1922.  The often snarling, bi-pedal black and white Boston Terrier was later named after the male lead in Margaret Mitchell's Gone with the Wind, because "No one loves Scarlett more than Rhett" referencing Rhett Butler's affection for Scarlett O'Hara (scarlet is BU's primary color).  In recent years Rhett has frequented Boston University games, events, and dining halls wearing his scarlet and white double-zero hockey jersey.  Other outfits include a basketball jersey and a referee uniform (typically worn during the short youth hockey games that take place during ice hockey intermissions). However, he is also known to enjoy wearing his scarlet superhero cape when the occasion presents itself.  Like all mascots, Rhett and the Terrier logo are ubiquitous at athletic events.  The Terriers play varsity Division I intercollegiate sports in ten men's and twelve women's programs. Rhett's nemesis is Baldwin, the Boston College eagle.

Rhett has participated in several ESPN "This is SportsCenter" commercials and competed three times in the Universal Cheerleading Association's mascot nationals, placing as high as fourth in 2002.  He was also named an All-American in 1996 and "Boston's Top Mascot" in 1998.

In 2006, BU's athletic logo featuring Rhett was altered slightly during a department-wide rebranding.  Rhett's mascot character also received a makeover, favoring more cartoonish characteristics.

References

External links 

 
Patriot League